Gerard Michael Kennedy (born July 24, 1960) is a Canadian politician in Ontario, Canada. He served as Ontario's minister of Education from 2003 to 2006, when he resigned to make an unsuccessful bid for the leadership of the Liberal Party of Canada. Kennedy previously ran for the leadership of the Ontario Liberal Party, losing to future premier Dalton McGuinty on the final ballot. He lost the 2013 Ontario Liberal leadership race.

While attending the University of Alberta in Edmonton, he became involved in the local food bank, eventually becoming its first executive director in 1983. In 1986, he moved to Toronto to run the Daily Bread Food Bank and did so until he entered politics, in 1996.

He was elected to the Legislative Assembly of Ontario as an Ontario Liberal Party Member of Provincial Parliament (MPP) in a 1996 by-election to replace former premier Bob Rae in the York South constituency. In the 1999 and 2003 general elections, he was elected to represent the new Parkdale—High Park constituency. He became the province's Minister of Education in 2003, serving in McGuinty's first government.

In 2006, he resigned his cabinet post and then his legislative seat to seek the federal Liberal Party's leadership. He finished third in delegate selection meetings, but at the leadership convention, he placed fourth on both the first and second ballot before withdrawing to support eventual winner Stéphane Dion.

In the 2008 federal election he ran for the Liberal Party of Canada in the Parkdale—High Park electoral district and was elected as its Member of Parliament (MP). He ran for re-election in the 2011 federal election, but lost to former MP, Peggy Nash.

Background
Kennedy is one of six children born to Jack and Caroline Kennedy (née Shemanski). Kennedy's father, descendant from Scottish ancestry originating in Cape Breton Island and the Ottawa Valley, ran a gas supply business in The Pas, Manitoba, eventually becoming that town's mayor. His mother's ancestry was Ukrainian, and her family lived in Canada's Prairie region.  At age 14, Kennedy moved to Winnipeg to attend  St. John's-Ravenscourt School on a hockey scholarship. After high school, he attended Trent University in Peterborough, Ontario, also on a hockey scholarship. When Trent's hockey program was cancelled, Kennedy switched education institutions and attended the University of Alberta to continue his undergraduate studies, but left in his fourth year, without completing his degree. He then worked as a historical researcher for the Government of Alberta in the early 1980s. He began his social activism career when he directed the volunteer program at an Edmonton Food Bank in 1983.

After moving to Ontario, Kennedy was the executive director of Toronto's Daily Bread Food Bank from 1986 to 1996. The food bank distributed $30 million worth of food each year without government funding; 150,000 people are estimated to have used its services every month.  Kennedy was named in Toronto Life Magazine's list of fifty influential people in 1992, and was named newsmaker of the year by the Toronto Star in 1993.  Kennedy was also given an honourable mention in the Financial Post Magazine'''s C.E.O. awards in 1995.

Kennedy is married to Jeanette Arsenault-Kennedy, a day care professional and Acadian (Francophone) from Prince Edward Island. They have two children, daughter Théria and son John-Julien.

Provincial politics

York South
Kennedy entered political life in May 1996, running in a by-election for the Ontario legislature in Toronto's York South constituency, which was vacated by former  Ontario New Democratic Party (NDP) leader Bob Rae. On May 23, Kennedy was the first candidate not from the NDP or its predecessor, the Co-operative Commonwealth Federation, to win the seat since 1955. He received 7774 votes; his nearest opponent was the NDP's David Miller, at the time, a Toronto city councillor, who received 6656 votes.

Despite being a newcomer to politics, Kennedy became the front-runner to replace Lyn McLeod as leader of the Ontario Liberal Party in late 1996. Although popular on the left-wing, he encountered a strong "anyone-but-Kennedy" movement from the party's establishment and right-wing which was divided among several candidates on the leadership convention floor. Kennedy finished first on the first, second, third and fourth ballots, but was defeated on the fifth ballot by Dalton McGuinty. Although McGuinty finished in fourth place on the first ballot, he was able to increase his support in the subsequent ballots, gaining delegates from the candidates that dropped off. The results of the leadership contest did not prove divisive within the party and both rivals eventually became strong allies. Kennedy served as the party's Health Critic during McGuinty's first opposition term.

Parkdale–High Park
Kennedy wanted to run in the redistributed York South—Weston constituency in the 1999 Ontario provincial election, because it contained most of his old York South constituency. However, he was persuaded to step aside for former leadership rival Joseph Cordiano. McGuinty's policies dealing with redistribution and sitting MPPs gave the senior MPP first choice in a redistributed riding, and Cordiano was the more senior of the two (he had served since 1985). He instead ran in the neighbouring riding of Parkdale—High Park, which contained about one fifth of his previous constituency, mostly the affluent Baby Point neighbourhood.  He faced an interesting challenge from Annamarie Castrilli, another former Liberal leadership challenger who had defected to the governing Progressive Conservatives on the last sitting day of the legislature. Media reportage at the time anticipated that this would be a close race, due to the perceived relative strength of the three main parties being almost equally divided in this newly constituted constituency.

The Progressive Conservatives were re-elected, forming another majority government. Despite the Conservatives' good showing across the province, they did not win a single seat in the old City of Toronto area; and, Kennedy won his seat with large plurality, with his closest rival, Castrilli, about 10,000 votes behind. He became opposition critic for the high-profile Education portfolio.

Minister of education
The Liberals won a majority in the 2003 Ontario provincial election, and Kennedy was re-elected in Parkdale-High Park with about 58 percent of the vote (his nearest opponent received 16 percent). He was appointed Minister of Education on October 23, 2003.

Under the two previous governments, the Education portfolio had been marked by considerable labour strife, due to either the austerity measure known as the Social Contract under the Bob Rae government, or school board restructuring under the Mike Harris government. In the spring of 2005, Kennedy announced the establishment of a provincial framework in teacher's negotiations, which would see teacher's salaries increase by approximately 10.5 percent over four years in exchange for four years of labour peace. The framework included priorities such as workplace preparation courses and English as a Second Language programs.

On October 26, Kennedy was awarded the inaugural Ontario Student Trustees' Association "Award of Distinction" for his contributions to education, including his expansion of the role of student trustee.

Federal politics

2006 federal Liberal leadership race

On April 5, 2006 Kennedy resigned as Minister of Education to pursue the federal Liberal Leadership. Premier McGuinty, who admitted that finding a replacement was difficult, was reported to have set that day as a deadline for Kennedy to make a decision in order to prevent the leadership speculation from overshadowing the Ontario government's agenda. Kennedy formally declared his candidacy in front of the House of Commons in Ottawa, on April 27, 2006.

On May 18, Kennedy formally resigned from the provincial legislature. This was after several weeks of criticism over drawing an MPP's salary, despite his absence from the legislature and his stated intention to live for part of the summer in Quebec. Kennedy responded saying that he intended to resign his seat "sooner rather than later," but first wanted to finish some local projects he'd been working on.

On August 16, Premier McGuinty called a by-election to replace Kennedy in Parkdale–High Park for September 14. The centre-left leaning riding was arguably held in part thanks to Kennedy's personal popularity (due to his work as food bank director and education minister) versus that of his party; Sylvia Watson could not retain the seat for the Liberals in the subsequent by-election, apparently being unable to "ride the coattails of Kennedy's popularity".

The Toronto Star reported that Gerard Kennedy appeared to have signed up more new members than any other candidate during the member recruitment period. The article stated that it had been "conventional wisdom" that Michael Ignatieff and Bob Rae were the leaders in the race but Kennedy's numbers indicated that it was a wide-open race.

On September 8, Joe Fontana, MP for London North Centre and Gerard Kennedy's Ontario Co-Chair, announced that he would be resigning his seat in the House of Commons to run for mayor in London; and, it was speculated Kennedy would run in the by-election, which he did not.

On "Super Weekend", from September 29 to October 1, the Liberal Party elected approximately 85% of delegates. Kennedy finished in third place with 17.3% of delegates being pledged to his campaign, a similar number to Stéphane Dion, who received 16.0% and to Bob Rae who received 20.3%.At the December Liberal leadership convention, the "Super Weekend" elected delegates were bound (or committed) to vote on the first ballot for the leadership candidate they had pledged to support. On the second and subsequent ballots, however, the delegates were – if they wished – able to switch their votes to another candidate. Besides sizable delegate support he  was supported also by 20 MPs and former MPs, with about a dozen Ontario MPPs.

On November 27, Kennedy attracted media attention when he became the first leadership candidate to oppose a motion being debated in the House of Commons of Canada, that would have declared the Québécois "a nation within a united Canada". Kennedy was joined in that position later that day by fellow candidates Ken Dryden and Joe Volpe.

At the convention, Dion placed higher than Kennedy in the first ballot voting, finishing ahead of Kennedy by two votes–17.8% to 17.7%). That gap increased to 2% after the second ballot–20.8% to 18.8%. Kennedy chose to leave the ballot before he would have been forced to, and supported Dion. Earlier, the two leadership contenders had allegedly struck a pact in which the first off the ballot would throw his support to the other. Pundits said that this surprise move had caught the Ignatieff and Rae strategists off guard. Kennedy delivered his delegates extraordinarily en masse'', as Dion's support increased to 37.0% on the third ballot, moving from third place to first and eliminating Rae. Dion retained the position for the fourth and decisive ballot which resulted in him winning the leadership.

Post leadership race
On December 19, 2006, Dion announced that Kennedy would be his special adviser on election readiness and renewal with "intimate involvement in all aspects of election readiness and the platform.  Kennedy was also the chair of the mentorship committee. Kennedy said that his duties as election readiness adviser ended in the summer of 2007, but he continued as a special adviser to Stéphane Dion, appeared regularly as a strategist for the Liberals on television and was often quoted as a Liberal spokesman in newspapers.

In late August 2007, Kennedy entered the academic world accepting a position at the Ted Rogers School of Management at Ryerson University. He served a one-year term as a Distinguished Visiting Professor until September 2008.

In late September 2007, Kennedy was part of a group observing Ukraine's parliamentary elections in the Mariupol electoral commission. Kennedy reported back to the Canadian media that the group he was a party to was confronted by Ukrainian police who stripped passports and observer statuses. Kennedy said that the police were interfering in the process, and the observer group felt intimidated by the police who carried weapons and followed the group around for a day. Kennedy concluded that there were major flaws in the voting process, as the group was also witness to extra ballots being distributed.

2008 Election in Parkdale–High Park

On February 6, 2007, Kennedy confirmed that he would seek the Liberal nomination for Parkdale—High Park in the next federal election. At the time, the electoral district was represented by New Democrat Peggy Nash. Kennedy won the nomination by acclamation on April 24, 2007.

On March 31, 2008, although he was not a member of the House of Commons of Canada, Kennedy was appointed to the Official Opposition Shadow Cabinet by leader Stéphane Dion. Kennedy served as Intergovernmental Affairs critic, which gave him responsibility to speak on behalf of the Liberal Party on matters of federal-provincial relations.

In the October 2008 federal election, Kennedy defeated Nash by over 3300 votes, or roughly by a seven percent margin. He was mentioned as a possible candidate in the 2008/09 Liberal leadership race, but eventually decided to pass on another leadership run.

War resisters bill

On September 17, 2009, Kennedy tabled a private member's bill in the House of Commons. The bill would change provisions of the Immigration and Refugee Protection Act to provide sanctuary in Canada for American and other countries' war resisters on moral, political or religious grounds.

2011 Election in Parkdale–High Park
In 2011, Kennedy sought re-election to his Parkdale–High Park seat against Peggy Nash in a rematch of the 2008 campaign. The campaign was heated at times, and on election night, harnessing the NDP's unprecedented levels of support, Nash defeated him to regain her old seat.

2013 Ontario Liberal Leadership Race

On November 12, 2012, Kennedy announced that he was seeking the leadership of the Ontario Liberal Party to replace Dalton McGuinty.

At his campaign launch in London, Kennedy criticized the government's Bill 115 to ban teacher's strikes and freeze wages. Of the seven candidates, Kennedy has said he would consider repealing the bill.

Former Liberal MPP Steve Peters gave his endorsement at the launch. On November 16, 2012, he gained the formal support of former cabinet minister George Smitherman and Joseph Cordiano On November 21, 2012, Niagara Falls MPP Kim Craitor endorsed Kennedy. Kennedy has also gained the support of MPP's Bob Delaney,and Shafiq Qaadri.

Early polls placed Kennedy ahead of other candidates to replace Premier McGuinty, helped by his name recognition from his federal and provincial work, and his role as director of the Food Bank. In a poll of Ontarion released on November 29, 2012 by Forum Research, 37% said they would support Kennedy, followed by Sandra Pupatello (23%), Kathleen Wynne (19%), Eric Hoskins (7%), Glen Murray (6%), and Charles Sousa (4%). Among Liberal voters, Kennedy scored first with 38% support.

After the second ballot, in which he placed third with 13.7% of the vote, Kennedy dropped out and endorsed the eventual winner, Wynne, who went on to become Premier of Ontario.

Private sector
Since February 2013, Kennedy has been CEO of Alpha Healthcare/Alpha Laboratories. He had previously served as a consultant to the company while serving as a Member of Parliament.

Electoral record

Cabinet offices held

References

Notes

Footnotes

External links 

1960 births
Living people
Ontario Liberal Party MPPs
Trent University alumni
Canadian people of Scottish descent
Canadian people of Ukrainian descent
University of Alberta alumni
Liberal Party of Canada leadership candidates
People from The Pas
Politicians from Toronto
Liberal Party of Canada MPs
Members of the House of Commons of Canada from Ontario
Members of the Executive Council of Ontario
21st-century Canadian politicians